Pierre-François Martin-Laval (nicknamed "PEF") is a French actor, film director, screenwriter and theatre director. PEF is well known in France for his acting performances in musical comedy but also in serious plays. He studied at the famous French school of acting Cours Florent. During his drama studies he met the friends with whom he formed the comedy team 'Les Robins des Bois' (The Robin Hoods) in 1996. Initially called The Royal Imperial Green Rabbit Company, they renamed themselves after their first significant success, a play entitled Robins des bois.

Les Robins des Bois first appeared on television in La Grosse Emission, a regular TV show on the channel Comédie! in which they presented short and utterly crazy plays. They quickly became popular and made appearances in French movies.

Filmography 
 L'un dans l'autre (2016) Bruno Chiche, with Stephane De Groodt, Louise Bourgoinl, Aure Atika
 Mon poussin (2016) Frederique Forestier, with Isabelle Nanty, Thomas Soliveres                 
 Un jour mon prince ! (2016) Flavia Coste, with Catherine Jacob
 Vilaine (2008) Jean-Patrick Benes, Allan Mauduit, with Marilou Berry, Chantal Lauby, Frédérique Bel
 Modern Love (2008) Stéphane Kazandjian, with Alexandra Lamy, Stéphane Rousseau, Bérénice Bejo  and Pierre-François Martin-Laval
 Essaye-moi (2006) Pierre-François Martin-Laval, with Julie Depardieu, Kad Merad and Pierre Richard
 Un ticket pour l'espace (2006) Éric Lartigau, with Kad et Olivier
 Casablanca Driver (2004) Maurice Barthélémy
 RRRrrrr!!! (2004) Alain Chabat
 Les clefs de bagnole (2003) Laurent Baffie
 La Prophétie des grenouilles (2003) Jacques-Rémy Girerd, with Michel Piccoli, Anouk Grinberg, Annie Girardot
 Le Bison (et sa voisine Dorine) (2003) Isabelle Nanty, with Isabelle Nanty, Édouard Baer et il aime la music et le toilette
 Astérix & Obélix : Mission Cléopâtre (2002 Alain Chabat, with Christian Clavier, Gérard Depardieu
 La Grande Vie (2001) directed by Philippe Dajoux with Michel Boujenah, Patrick Bosso, Christian Charmetant
 Le mal de mère (2001) directed by Édouard Molinaro, with Frédéric Diefenthal, Line Renaud
 La tour Montparnasse infernale (2001) directed by Charles Némès, with Éric Judor, Ramzy Bedia, Marina Foïs
 La Vérité si je mens ! 2 (2001) directed by Thomas Gilou, with José Garcia, Gad Elmaleh, Richard Anconina
 Les Frères Sœur (2000) directed by Frédéric Jardin, with José Garcia, Denis Podalydès, Jackie Berroyer
 Girl on the Bridge (1999) directed by Patrice Leconte, with Daniel Auteuil, Vanessa Paradis
 Trafic d'influence (1999) Dominique Farrugia, with Thierry Lhermitte, Gérard Jugnot, Aure Atika
 Zooloo (1999) a short movie directed by Nicolas Bazz, with Pierre Richard
 Serial Lover (1998)  directed by James Huth, with Michèle Laroque, Albert Dupontel, Zinedine Soualem
 Mémoires d'un jeune con (1996) directed by Patrick Aurignac, with Christophe Hemon, François Périer, Patrick Aurignac
 Le collecteur (1992) a short movie directed by Ronan Fournier-Christol, with André Badin, Jean-Christophe Berjon, Julie Lopes-Curval and Éric Massot
 French voice of Emile in Ratatouille, Pixar studio, August 2007.

Director 
 2006 : Essaye-moi
 2009 : King Guillaume
 2013 : Serial Teachers
 2015 : Serial Teachers 2
 2018 :

Television 
Capitaine Marleau
French television crime drama series; 
(2018, Season 1 Episode 12, 23 October, "Double Jeu", "Double Dealing", as Paul Dalvet)
  The Disappearance 
French television crime drama series (2015) as Julien Morel

Theatre

Actor 
 Robin des Bois d'à peu près Alexandre Dumas, adapted from Alexandre Dumas (1997, stage director Pierre-François Martin-Laval)
 Les caprices de Mariannes (1996, Jean-Paul Rouve)
 Le goût de la Hierarchie (1996, directed by Édouard Baer, with Isabelle Nanty)
 Mémoire et intamarre (1995, V. Martin)
 L'ascenseur (1994, M. Henada)
 L'arbramouche (stage director par V. Martin)
 La mouette (stage director Isabelle Nanty)
 Reniflard and Co. adapted from Marx Brothers (1993, Jean-Christophe Berjon)
 Un couple ordinaire (1993, R. Kuperberg)
 On garde le moral (1992, A. Halimi)
 Le bébé de Monsieur Laurent, Roland Topor (1991, stage director: Jean-Christophe Berjon)
 Georges Dandin (1991, S. Brisé)

Stage director 
 Patrick Bosso Exagère (2000, in Palais des Glaces)
 Kad et Olivier (1999, au Café de la Danse)
 Robin des Bois d'à peu près Alexandre Dumas, adapted from Alexandre Dumas (1997, in Théâtre de la Gaîté-Montparnasse)
 Éric et Ramzy (1996–1998, in the Bec Fin, the Café de la Gare, Le Splendid and in the Palais des Glaces)
 En attendant l'Olympia with Pascal Vincent (1995-1996 barnstorming in Switzerland)
 Capri c'est fini with Kad&Olivier (1998, in Café de la Danse)
 Presque grande (1997, in Théâtre Clavel)

References

External links

 
 Fan-Club

1968 births
Living people
Male actors from Marseille
French male film actors
French film directors
French male screenwriters
French screenwriters
French male stage actors
French male television actors
French theatre directors
Cours Florent alumni